The Stockholmsarenan, known as the Tele2 Arena for sponsorship reasons, is a retractable roof multi-purpose stadium in Stockholm Globe City, Johanneshov, just south of Stockholm City Centre, Sweden. It is used mostly for concerts and football matches, hosting home matches of Allsvenskan teams Djurgårdens IF and Hammarby IF. The arena has a capacity of 30,000 to 35,000 spectators for football matches, depending on the number of people standing, and its facilities fulfill the requirements of FIFA and UEFA for hosting international games and tournaments. When configured for concerts, the arena has a capacity of 45,000 spectators.

History

With a maximum capacity of up to 40,000 and a retractable roof, the arena is able to host concerts, equestrian, motorsport, ice sports, banquettes, exhibitions, company events and shareholder meetings, in addition to football.

The cost was calculated to be 2.7 billion SEK including land appropriation and a new parking garage under the arena. The cost was balanced against income from sales of building rights and rental from the operator who runs the arena. Financing was mostly covered by sale of land, mainly the lot where Söderstadion was situated and associated building rights for commercial premises. The owner is the City of Stockholm via subsidiary SGA Fastigheter AB.

The arena was planned to host the opening game of the ice hockey World Championship 2013, but the construction was delayed and the arena was not finished until July 2013, two months after the tournament. Initially, it was intended that the stadium would stage the finals of the Swedish Super League, but after the delay, it was decided that the finals in 2013 and 2014 would be moved to Malmö Arena. It is decided that Stockholmsarenan will be the national stadium of Swedish speedway and American football.

It is also possible to have artificially-frozen ice on the ground. The bandy team of Hammarby IF has practiced on the ice when this possibility was tried for the first time, but the team will so far still use Zinkensdamms IP as their home ground for bandy. "Bandyns dag" ("Bandy Day") was supposed to be arranged at the arena on 14 December 2013 with a match against IFK Vänersborg as the climax but had to be cancelled due to problems with preparing the ice. Instead, the match against Sandvikens AIK on 10 January 2014 was played at Stockholmsarenan.

On 27 June 2013, just days before Hammarby's first football match at their new arena, an explosive device was found outside the stadium. Former players from rivals Djurgården were to play a friendly that evening in front of approximately 3,000 spectators, but the game was cancelled due to the threat. The culture commissioner for the City of Stockholm has stated that the city council "has authority over who gets to play there, and that power will be used" if the situation does not get under control.

The first official event at the stadium was a football match between Hammarby and Örgryte IS on 20 July 2013. The match, which ended in a 0–0 draw, brought in 29,175 spectators, setting a new record for highest attendance at a Superettan match. The following day, a crowd of 27,798 attended Djurgårdens IF's inaugural match at Stockholmsarenan, a 1–2 defeat by IFK Norrköping.

Events

Two football teams from Stockholm, Hammarby IF and Djurgårdens IF, have played their home games at Stockholmsarenan since July 2013. Another Stockholm club, IF Brommapojkarna, have occasionally played matches against the other Stockholm teams at Stockholmsarenan instead of at their usual home ground, Grimsta IP.

The official inauguration took place on 24 August 2013, featuring Swedish artists Robyn, Lars Winnerbäck and Kent, but the first concert at Stockholmsarenan had already taken place on 27 July 2013, with Swedish band Gyllene Tider performing.

On 28 February and 1 March 2014, Swedish superstar Avicii made two sold-out concerts with 35,000 and 40,000 spectators respectively.

The Rolling Stones played at Stockholmsarenan on 1 July 2014 as part of the European leg of their 14 On Fire tour. It was the band's 26th-ever appearance in Sweden.

Paul McCartney played at Stockholmsarenan on 9 July 2015 as part of the European leg of his Out There Tour.

Madonna visited Stockholmsarenan with her Rebel Heart Tour on 14 November 2015, attracting over 39,000 people.

In 2015, the American football World Championship was to be hosted in Stockholm, with Stockholmsarenan as the only venue.

On 24 January 2015, the Arena hosted UFC on Fox: Gustafsson vs. Johnson, a mixed martial arts match between Swedish fighter Alexander Gustafsson and American Anthony Johnson. In 2015 and 2016, the Swedish Bandy Finals have been held at the arena. In addition, Hammarby IF have played single matches here.

Adele performed at the arena as a part of her Adele Live 2016 Tour on 29 April 2016.

Rihanna performed at the arena as a part of her Anti World Tour on 4 July 2016.

Justin Bieber performed at the arena as a part of his Purpose World Tour on 29 and 30 September 2016.

On 17 June 2017, for her Celine Dion Live 2017 tour, Celine Dion performed in front of a crowd of a less than average 21,699, selling out almost instantly. She interestingly decided to divide the stadium in half for her show, citing “Better experience for the audience and for logistical reasons”.

Axwell, Sebastian Ingrosso and Steve Angello performed three reunion shows as the Swedish House Mafia at Stockholmsarenan from 2 to 4 May 2019, after they split up in March 2013 ending their One Last Tour at the Ultra Music Festival. Tickets for these shows sold out fast; more than 120,000 tickets were sold within 5 minutes.

It will host several matches of the 2023 World Men's Handball Championship, which Sweden will co-host alongside Poland.

Laleh will be the first Swedish female artist to headline a concert at the arena, as part of her national summer tour dates in 2023.

List of concerts

Highest attendances

Interior and tifos

Average attendances

Four fixtures each played behind closed doors during 2021 season.

See also
 Annexet
 Avicii Arena (The Globe)
 Friends Arena
 Stockholm Globe City

References

External links

Official site of Tele2 Arena
SGA Fastigheter AB
Stockholm Globe Arenas

Football venues in Sweden
Bandy venues in Sweden
Multi-purpose stadiums in Sweden
Retractable-roof stadiums in Europe
Sports venues in Stockholm
Football venues in Stockholm
Djurgårdens IF Fotboll
Hammarby Fotboll
Swedish Bandy Final venues
American football venues in Sweden
Sports venues completed in 2013
2013 establishments in Sweden